Echoplex is a live music venue located in the Echo Park neighborhood of Los Angeles, California. It is owned and operated by the same people as The Echo, and the two are considered sister venues. It is located and commonly described as being "below The Echo", leading some to erroneously believe that its official title is "Echoplex Below The Echo". Along with The Echo, Echoplex is affiliated with Spaceland in the Silver Lake neighborhood of Los Angeles.

Notable acts
Beth Hart  
Joe Bonamassa
Rolling Stones  
Nine Inch Nails
Thom Yorke

References

Music venues in Los Angeles
Echo Park, Los Angeles